Toronto Metropolitan University Library is the library of Toronto Metropolitan University in Toronto, Canada. The library collection consists of over 500,000 books, and over CAD$3 million is spent annually to acquire electronic resources, including e-journals, e-books, databases and indexes, geospatial data, and catalogued websites or electronic documents. Most of the electronic resources can be accessed remotely by TMU community members with Internet access, although authentication of Toronto Metropolitan University Library registration is required for access to all commercial resources. The Library acquires materials to support the curriculum taught at the university and to support the research needs of faculty. All hard copy materials are housed in the Library building at Gould and Victoria Streets. In addition to library materials, the Library provides access to desktop computers, laptops, as well as research help and technology assistance.

The 11-storey tower was built in 1974, and is an example of Brutalist architecture.

On January 18, 2008, the university announced the acquisition of properties including the former site of Sam the Record Man, which allowed the expansion of the library to a prime Yonge Street location. The expansion was designed by architectural firms Zeidler Partnership Architects of Toronto and Snøhetta of Oslo, Norway.

In February 2015, the library expansion opened its doors as the Student Learning Center (SLC).

Ronald D. Besse Information & Learning Commons 

The Ronald D. Besse Information and Learning Commons, located on the main floor of the Toronto Metropolitan University Library, provides access to a wide range of information resources with various technology available to student, faculty and staff.

The Commons area was named after a donation from Ronald D. Besse, the Commons provides learning support through a variety of services such as classroom instruction, reference services and technology support.

Archives and Special Collections 

The Toronto Metropolitan University Archives serves as the institutional memory of the university. The Archives acquires, preserves, and makes accessible a broad range of primary source materials which provide an administrative, academic, fiscal, legal, social, and cultural record of Toronto Metropolitan University. Special Collections was established to help support the learning and teaching needs and facilitate the scholarly, research and creative activities of the TMU community by acquiring and preserving photography, film and cultural history objects. We have a particular responsibility to help students and staff gain access to objects in niche subject areas and aid them in the interpretation of those objects.

References

External links 
 
 Official site

Library buildings completed in 1974
Toronto Metropolitan University buildings
Libraries in Toronto
Academic libraries in Canada
Brutalist architecture in Canada
Libraries established in 1974